Dan McCorquodale (born December 17, 1934 in Longville, Louisiana) is an American politician from Newton, Texas, a former California State Senator, and a member of the Democratic Party.

Early career
Before entering politics, McCorquodale was a teacher in the California public schools. McCorquodale then served as a Santa Clara County Supervisor, winning election in 1972 and being reelected in 1976 and 1980.

State Senate
In 1982, McCorquodale was elected to the San Jose based 12th district in the California State Senate, narrowly defeating Republican incumbent Dan O'Keefe.

Defeat
In 1986, he won a difficult reelection against Santa Clara County Supervisor Tom Legan. Although he won easy reelection in 1990, McCorquodale lost his seat in 1994 to Dick Monteith a conservative Republican businessman. His senate district had shifted from his home base of San Jose into the more conservative Central Valley after reapportionment partly leading to his defeat in a mid-term election in which the GOP made significant gains.

Controversy
In 2022, the San Jose Mercury News reported that McCorquodale's wife, Jean, had earned millions of dollars from Santa Clara County through grant writing and the authorship of a government history book. Further investigation by the newspaper found that large portions of the county government history book's working manuscript were copied directly from websites like Wikipedia and The History Channel. A county-led inquiry prompted by District 3 Supervisor Otto Lee found that Jean McCorquodale was paid over $1 million to produce the book.

References

External links
JoinCalifornia Dan McCorquodale

1934 births
Living people
Democratic Party California state senators
County supervisors in California
People from Newton, Texas
20th-century American politicians